Jan Pawłowicz (born 9 July 1960) is a Polish sprinter. He competed in the men's 4 × 400 metres relay at the 1980 Summer Olympics.

References

1960 births
Living people
Athletes (track and field) at the 1980 Summer Olympics
Polish male sprinters
Olympic athletes of Poland
Place of birth missing (living people)
Zawisza Bydgoszcz athletes